Osmar Mares Martínez (born 17 June 1987) is a Mexican former professional footballer who played as a left-back. Mares has been capped for the Mexico national team at the U-20 level, and played in the 2007 FIFA U-20 World Cup in Canada.

Career
He played for most of his career in Santos Laguna, starting from 2006, and ending in 2015, when Club América purchased him after a year loan. Other than Santos and America, he also had a stint with San Luis in 2010. In February 2015, Mares scored his first goal for America in a Concacaf Champions League quarter final match against  Saprissa, in which America won 2–0.

Honours
Santos Laguna
Mexican Primera División: Clausura 2012

América
Liga MX: Apertura 2014
CONCACAF Champions League: 2014–15, 2015–16

References

External links
 
 

1987 births
Living people
Footballers from Coahuila
Mexican footballers
Association football defenders
Mexico under-20 international footballers
Santos Laguna footballers
San Luis F.C. players
Club América footballers
Liga MX players
Sportspeople from Torreón